Cynthia J. Popp (born May 6, 1962) is an American television director and producer on the soap opera The Bold and the Beautiful. She produced music videos for John McCook, Bobbie Eakes and Jeff Trachta and The Wiggles. Beside working on daytime, Popp directed two episodes of Frasier.

Positions held
Jacob's Edge
Director (present)
Producer (present)
The Bold and the Beautiful
Director (1996–present)
Producer (1999–present)
Associate Director (1990–1999)
Production Associate (1986–1992)

Frasier
Director (2003–2004)

Passions
Director (1999)

Awards and nominations
Daytime Emmy Award
Win, 2009, Producing Team, The Bold and The Beautiful
Nomination, 2007, Producing Team, The Bold and The Beautiful
Nomination, 2004, Producing Team, The Bold and The Beautiful
Nomination, 2003, Producing Team, The Bold and The Beautiful
Nomination, 2008, Directing Team, The Bold and The Beautiful
Nomination, 2006, Directing Team, The Bold and The Beautiful
Nomination, 2002, Directing Team, The Bold and The Beautiful
Nomination, 2000, Directing Team, The Bold and The Beautiful

Directors Guild of America Award
Win, 1995, Directing Team, The Bold and the Beautiful, (episode 1884)
Win, 1992, Directing Team, The Bold and the Beautiful, (episode 1103)

References

External links

1962 births
American television directors
American television producers
American women television producers
Daytime Emmy Award winners
American women television directors
Living people
Soap opera producers
Place of birth missing (living people)
21st-century American women